Curly Wurly is a brand of chocolate bar manufactured by Cadbury UK and sold worldwide. It was launched in the UK in 1970. Its shape resembles three flattened, intertwined serpentine strings. The bar is made of chocolate-coated caramel.

History
This design was created by David John Parfitt, a long-serving research confectioner based at the Cadbury Bournville factory, while he was experimenting with some surplus toffee from another piece of work. It was launched in 1970.

Rival products
Similar products were launched by several rival confectionery companies.  These were either to compete with Cadbury, or else to act as a spoiler for a Cadbury launch.

Mars
In Europe, Mars introduced a bar in March 1972 with the French name "3 Musketiers". The packaging had drawings of the titular Three Musketeers on it. In 1976 this was changed to look more like the US Marathon. The German versions were called "3 Musketiere" and "Leckerschmecker", the Dutch version was called "3 Musketiers". Mars' 3 Musketiers bar in Europe is not to be confused with their 3 Musketeers bar in the U.S. which is a completely different product that does not contain caramel (marketed as the Milky Way in the UK).

In the US, Mars marketed their version as "Marathon" in the 1970s and 1980s, first sold in August 1973. Cadbury had launched the Curly Wurly in the U.S. only weeks earlier. The Mars version had bright red packaging with a ruler printed on the reverse with 8 inches (20 cm) markings demonstrating that it was as long as it claimed. It was discontinued in October 1981.

The U.S. Marathon bar is not to be confused with the Marathon bar sold by Mars in the UK which was nothing like a Curly Wurly.  The UK Marathon was a chocolate covered peanut bar in a brown packet with blue lettering.  It was renamed Snickers in 1990, by which name it is still sold.

Mackintosh
A Canadian product made by Mackintosh's, in English known as the "Wig Wag", was available in the 1970s.

Marabou
A Swedish version was called "Loop", released in 2011 under the Swedish brand Marabou (owned by Kraft).

See also

 List of chocolate bar brands

References

External links
 Cadbury UK

Products introduced in 1971
British confectionery
Cadbury brands
Chocolate bars
Mondelez International brands